Healthy city is a term used in public health and urban design to stress the impact of policy on human health. It is a municipality that continually improves on a physical and a social level until environmental and pathological conditions are reached establishing an acceptable morbidity rate for the population. Its modern form derives from a World Health Organization (WHO) initiative on Healthy Cities and Villages in 1986, but has a history dating back to the mid 19th century. The term was developed in conjunction with the European Union, but rapidly became international as a way of establishing healthy public policy at the local level through health promotion. It emphasises the multi-dimensionality of health as laid out in WHO's constitution and, more recently, the Ottawa Charter for Health Promotion. An alternative term is Healthy Communities, or Municipios saludables in parts of Latin America.

Approaches
Many jurisdictions which have healthy community programmes and cities can apply to become a WHO-designated "Healthy City". WHO defines the Healthy City as:
"one that is continually creating and improving those physical and social environments and expanding those community resources which enable
people to mutually support each other in performing all the functions of life and in developing to their maximum potential."

Measuring the indices required, establishing standards and determining the impact of each component on health is difficult. In some regions such as Europe, a health impact assessment is a required piece of public policy development.

There are many networks of healthy cities, including in Europe and internationally, such as the Alliance for Healthy Cities. A key feature is ensuring that the social determinants of health are taken into consideration in urban design and urban governance. For example, "urbanization and health" was the theme of the 2010 World Health Day. One tool in developing healthy cities is social entrepreneurship.

See also
15 minute city
 Carfree city
Co-benefits of climate change mitigation
Health promotion
Alliance for Healthy Cities
 
 
 
Primary health care
Health for all
Public health
 
Social influences on fitness behavior

 Urban vitality
Zero-carbon city

References

Further reading
Kenzer M. Healthy cities: a guide to the literature.  Environment and Urbanization, 11(1), April 1999.
Boonekamp GMM et al.  Healthy Cities Evaluation: the co-ordinators perspective. Health Promotion International 14(2): 103, 1999.
 Special Supplement on European Healthy Cities. Health Promotion International, Volume 24, Supplement 1, November 2009.
 J Ashton, P Grey, K Barnard. Healthy cities — WHO's New Public Health initiative. Health Promotion International, 1(3): 319-324, 1986.

External links 
 World Health Organization - Healthy Cities
 The Health City

Environmental social science concepts
Public health
World Health Organization
Environment by city